Mladý Smolivec is a municipality and village in Plzeň-South District in the Plzeň Region of the Czech Republic. It has about 700 inhabitants.

Administrative parts
Villages of Budislavice, Dožice, Radošice and Starý Smolivec are administrative parts of Mladý Smolivec.

References

Villages in Plzeň-South District